The 2018–19 Egypt Cup qualifying rounds open the 87th season of the competition in Egypt, the oldest association football single knockout competition in Africa.

Calendar
The calendar for the 2018–19 Egypt Cup qualifying rounds, as announced by the Egyptian Football Association.

First Preliminary Round
First Preliminary Round fixtures were played from 12 to 18 August 2018. A total of 205 teams from the Egyptian Third Division and the Egyptian Fourth Division entered at this stage of the competition. A large number of clubs did not enter the competition due to financial status and other different reasons, including Al Fanar, a club that was playing in the Egyptian Second Division in the previous season. The results were as follows:

The following teams received a bye for this round:

 MS Abou Souyer
 MS Damietta
 MS El Qais

Second Preliminary Round
Second Preliminary Round fixtures were played on 4 and 5 September 2018. The results were as follows:

The following teams received a bye for this round:

 6 October (North Sinai)
 Abou Kebir
 Arab El Raml
 Ashmoun
 Assiut Petroleum
 Beni Ebeid
 Eastern Company
 Al Ghaba
 Ghazl Suez
 Helwan El A'am
 Al Hilal (Aswan)
 Al Hilal (El Daba'a)
 El Horreya
 Ittihad Nabarouh
 Kaskada
 Al Maragha
 Matar Taris
 Mega Sport
 Menouf
 El Montazah
 MS Al Amir
 MS Atsa
 MS Eitay El Baroud
 MS Koum Hamada
 MS Maghagha
 El Nobah
 Osmathon Tanta
 Planes Factory
 El Qanater El Khairiya
 El Qawmi
 Qena
 El Qouseiya
 Al Rebat & Al Anwar
 Al Said (El Mahalla)
 Samanoud
 El Senbellawein
 Sers El Layan
 Sheko
 Sporting Alexandria
 Taraji El Daba'a
 Telecom Egypt
 Workers (El Mansoura)

Third Preliminary Round
Third Preliminary Round fixtures were played on 24, 25 and 26 September 2018. A total of 39 teams from the Egyptian Second Division entered at this stage of the competition. Damietta, El Tahrir and Al Walideya, all playing in the 2018–19 Egyptian Second Division, did not enter the competition. The results were as follows:

Fourth Preliminary Round
Fourth Preliminary Round fixtures were played on 29 and 30 September 2018. The results were as follows:

Fifth Preliminary Round
Fifth Preliminary Round fixtures were played on 3 October 2018. The results were as follows:

Competition proper

Winners from the Fifth Preliminary Round advance to the Round of 32, where teams from the Egyptian Premier League enter the competition.

References

qualifying rounds
Egypt Cup qualifying rounds